Atilio Raúl Herrera (born January 21, 1951 in Buenos Aires, Argentina) is a former Argentine-Chilean footballer who played for clubs of Argentina and Chile.

Teams
  River Plate 1971-1972
  Estudiantes de Buenos Aires 1973
  Huracán 1974-1975
  Colo-Colo 1976-1980
  Palestino 1981
  Deportes Iquique 1982
  Rangers 1983-1986
  Palestino 1987
  San Miguel 1988-1990
  Magallanes 1991

Titles
  Colo-Colo  1979 (Chilean Primera División Championship)

External links
 
 Atilio Herrera at playmakerstats.com (English version of ceroacero.es)

1951 births
Living people
Footballers from Buenos Aires
Argentine footballers
Argentine expatriate footballers
Argentine emigrants to Chile
Naturalized citizens of Chile
Chilean footballers
Chilean expatriate footballers
Club Atlético River Plate footballers
Estudiantes de Buenos Aires footballers
Club Atlético Huracán footballers
Colo-Colo footballers
Club Deportivo Palestino footballers
Deportes Iquique footballers
Rangers de Talca footballers
Club Atlético San Miguel footballers
Magallanes footballers
Deportes Magallanes footballers
Argentine Primera División players
Primera Nacional players
Chilean Primera División players
Primera B Metropolitana players
Primera B de Chile players
Argentine expatriate sportspeople in Chile
Expatriate footballers in Chile
Association footballers not categorized by position